Band emission, is the fraction of the total emission from a blackbody that is in a certain wavelength interval or band. For a prescribed temperature, T and the spectral interval from 0 to λ, is the ratio of the total emissive power of a black body  from 0 to λ to the total emissive power over the entire spectrum.

See also
Spectral bands

Spectroscopy